Cox River is a river of the Canterbury region of New Zealand. It arises in the Crawford Range of the Southern Alps and flows generally southward through the Arthur's Pass National Park to join the Poulter River. The river was named for J. W. M. Cox, a landholder in the 1860s at the junction of Cox River and Bull Creek.

Geomorphology
Prior to glaciation the Cox River flowed through the Pūkio Stream valley, discharging into the Esk River, a lower tributary of the Waimakariri River. This route was later blocked by a series of terminal moraines deposited by the Cox glacier during the Pleistocene period. The river then created a new outlet through to the main Poulter valley via a rocky gorge, known as McArthur Gorge, which now contains the East Branch of the Poulter.

See also
List of rivers of New Zealand

References

Rivers of Canterbury, New Zealand
Rivers of New Zealand